Essay on a Course of Liberal Education for Civil and Active Life (1765) is an educational treatise by the 18th-century British polymath Joseph Priestley.

Dedicated to the governing board of Warrington Academy at which Priestley was a tutor, it argues that the education of young people should anticipate their practical needs, something Priestley accused the current universities, Dissenting and Establishment alike, of failing to do. In Priestley's eyes, the contemporary focus on a traditional classical education prevented students from acquiring useful skills. This principle of utility guided his unconventional curricular choices for Warrington's aspiring middle-class businessmen. He proposed that students study English and the modern languages instead of the classical languages, learn practical mathematics, read modern rather than ancient history, and study the constitution and laws of England. He believed that these topics would prepare his students for the commercial middle-class life that most of them would live; he did not believe that the poor should receive this same education, arguing "it could be of no service to their country, and often a real detriment to themselves." The board was convinced and in 1766 Warrington Academy replaced its classical curriculum with Priestley's liberal arts model.

Some scholars of education have argued that this work and Priestley's later Miscellaneous Observations relating to Education (1778) (often reprinted with the Essay on Education) made Priestley the "most considerable English writer on educational philosophy" between the 17th-century John Locke and the 19th-century Herbert Spencer.

Notes

Bibliography
Schofield, Robert E. The Enlightenment of Joseph Priestley: A Study of his Life and Work from 1733 to 1773. University Park: Pennsylvania State University Press, 1997. .
Sheps, Arthur. "Joseph Priestley's Time Charts: The Use and Teaching of History by Rational Dissent in late Eighteenth-Century England." Lumen 18 (1999): 135–154.
Thorpe, T.E. Joseph Priestley. London: J. M. Dent, 1906.
Watts, R. "Joseph Priestley and education." Enlightenment and Dissent 2 (1983): 83–100.

External links
 Full text of the essay
 Joseph Priestley, Biography by Britannica
 Lectures on History and General Policy; to Which is Prefixed, an Essay on a Course of Liberal Education for Civil and Active Life
 Online books by Joseph Priestley, provided by the Library of University of Pennsylvania
 Organizing Your Social Sciences Research Paper: Reviewing Collected Essays, by libguides
 Organizing Your Social Sciences Research Paper: Writing a Speech, by ultius
 People: Joseph Priestley - facts, information, pictures, by encyclopedia

1765 books
Books by Joseph Priestley
Books about education